Mundugumor (Munduguma, Mundukomo)  Biwat is a Yuat language of Papua New Guinea. It is spoken in Biwat village of Yuat Rural LLG, East Sepik Province.

Phonology
Mundukumo consonants are:

{| 
| p || t ||  || k
|-
| ᵐb || ⁿd || ᶮʤ || ᵑg
|-
| m || n || ɲ || ŋ
|-
| f || s ||  || 
|-
| mv ||  ||  || 
|-
|  || r ||  || 
|-
| w ||  || j || 
|}

Nouns
Some examples showing Mundukomo nouns and their irregular plural forms:

{| 
! gloss !! singular !! plural
|-
| ‘snake’ || mas || mase
|-
| ‘tooth’ || adusuva || adusuvavi
|-
| ‘bone’ || avu || avuvavi
|-
| ‘nose’ || ŋlək || ŋlu
|-
| ‘thigh’ || guak || go
|-
| ‘hand’ || klik || klia
|-
| ‘dog’ || ken || kidu
|-
| ‘betelnut’ || siman || simadu
|-
| ‘ear’ || tuan || tuadu
|-
| ‘fire’ || mən || məda
|-
| ‘basket’ || ban || bada
|-
| ‘mouth’ || balaŋ || balaji
|-
| ‘house’ || klaŋ || klagi
|-
| ‘star’ || susuaŋ || susuagi
|-
| ‘water’ || mam || mabi
|-
| ‘neck’ || volam || volabi
|-
| ‘ball’ || muŋmam || muŋmabi
|-
| ‘cassowary’ || kalim || kalimu
|-
| ‘girl’ || analom || analomu
|-
| ‘paddle’ || dum || dumu
|}

Similar patterns of complex nominal plural allomorphy are also found in the Lower Sepik-Ramu languages.

External links 
 Paradisec has a collection of recordings of Biwat language. They also have a collection of recordings from Papua New Guinea, Australia and the Pacific from Don Laycock that includes Biwat materials.

Further reading
McDowell, Nancy. 1991. The Mundugumor: From the Fieldnotes of Margaret Mead and Reo Fortune. Washington: Smithsonian Institution Press.
McElvenny, James. 2007. Notes on Mundukumo. Unpublished manuscript, Department of Linguistics, University of Sydney.

References

Yuat languages
Languages of East Sepik Province